Art n' Soul is an American contemporary R&B group that was active in the mid-1990s. The band consisted of Sam Bostic (lead vocals, bass, and keyboards), Rodney Lattrel Evans (keyboards) and Dion Riley (drums).

Prior to forming Art n' Soul, Bostic attempted a solo career under Atlantic Records with his 1985 debut album Circuitry. After the album stalled, he turned to production for other artists such as E-40, The Conscious Daughters, 2Pac and Master P. He later returned to performing as the founder and leader of Art n' Soul with fellow members Rodney Lattrel Evans and Dion Riley.

Tony! Toni! Toné! drummer Timothy Christian Riley helped the trio secure a recording contract with Atlantic Records subsidiary Big Beat Records to release their 1996 debut Touch of Soul. Their debut album yielded two singles: "Ever Since You Went Away" and "All My Luv".

Sam Bostic released his second solo album Soul Supreme on Soul Jones/Expansion Records in the UK in November 2008. The album was later released stateside on Bostic's boutique imprint House Of Soul Recordings in 2011 and featured the single "Zodiac Sign" which was co-written by Raphael Saadiq. Bostic is also the nephew of jazz saxophonist Earl Bostic.

Discography

Albums

Singles

References

External links
 

American contemporary R&B musical groups
Big Beat Records (American record label) artists
Musical groups from Oakland, California